Svarozhits (Latin: Zuarasiz, Zuarasici, Old East Slavic: Сварожиць, Russian: Сварожиц), Svarozhich (Old East Slavic: Сварожичь, Russian: Сварожич) is a Slavic god of fire, son of Svarog. One of the few Pan-Slavic gods. He is most likely identical with Radegast, less often identified with Dazhbog.

Etymology 

The theonym Svarozhits comes from the theonym Svarog with the suffix -its, -ich. According to most scholars, Svarog is related to the word svar "quarrel", svariti "to quarrel, argue", and cognate words are Old English andswaru (→ English swear), Old Norse sverja "to swear", or Sanskrit svarati (स्वरति) "to sing", "to sound", "to praise". An affinity has also been suggested with Old High German gi-swerc "storm clouds", Old English sweorc "darkness, cloud, fog", Dutch zwerk "cloud, cloudy sky", and Indian svárgas "heaven". It has also been suggested that Svarog may be a borrowing from Indo-Aryan languages, but the Slavs and Indo-Aryans were separated by too much space for them to have direct contact.

The suffix -its, -ich (Proto-Slavic *-itj, *-iťь) is generally considered a patronymic suffix, i.e. Svarozhits literally means "son of Svarog" (compare Polish pan "master" → panicz "son of master"). Some scholars, however, believe that the suffix here serves a diminutive function, and Svarozhits means "young, little Svarog", just as Serbo-Croatian Djurdjić is not "son of Djurdjo", but "little Djurdjo", or surviving up to the 18th century, Polabian büg and büzäc. Aleksander Brückner refers to Lithuanian prayers where the diminutive form dievaite is used instead of dieve (e.g. Perkune dievaite).

Sources

Polabian Slavs 
Svarozhits first appears in a text concerning the Polabian Slavs. The Christian monk Bruno of Querfurt, in a letter to king Henry II in 1008, writes to end his alliance with the pagan Veleti, make peace with Boleslav the Brave, and resume christianization missions among the Slavs:

Henry II continued his alliance with the Veleti despite criticism from the clergy. For this reason, around 1018, the bishop and chronicler Thietmar of Merseburg, while criticizing the alliance with the pagans, briefly describes their religion in his Chronicle: 

The boar that emerges from the lake near Radogoszcz later in the Chronicle may be related to Svarozhits. The boar in European cultures is often associated with fire and the sun.

East Slavs 
Svarozhits also appears in the Eastern Slavs in a homiletic work from the 12th century Sermon by One Who Loves Christ: "to the fire they pray, calling it Svarozhich", and in Sermon by the Holy Father Saint John Chrysostom:

Ibn Rustah's work Book of Precious Gems may also refer to Svarozhits: "They are all fire worshippers and the majority sow millet.When harvest time arrives, they collect the millet grain onto a shovel, raise it towards the sky and say: “Oh Lord, you are the one who provides for us and we have none left". However, the term "fire worshippers" found in Arabic sources does not always refer to fire as a deity, but is an Arabic term for idolatry.

South Slavic folklore 
In Slovenian Styria, a demon named Švaržič (Shvarzhich) was known, which proves the cult of Svarozhits among the South Slavs. In 1952, Croatian ethnomusicologist Zvonko Lovrenčević wrote down a folk song from the village of Ciglena near Bjelovar, which was presented by Kate Kuntin (born 1868). The song was sung at Christmas in her family until 1980 only at home, never in church: 

The song was also known to Ivana Brlić-Mažuranić, who already in 1916 placed it, in a form modified by her (Moj božiću Svarožiću, zlatno sunce, bijeli svijet! "My little Svarozhich, golden sun, white world!"), in her fable Kako je Potjeh tražio istinu.

Proper names 
The cult of Svarozhits is also evidenced by numerous toponymes, such as Swarzędz, Swarożyn (formerly Swarzyszewo) in Poland, Svařeň, Svárov, Svaryšov in Czechia, Polabian Swarzyn (currently Schwerin), and the tabooed forms of the deity's name present in such local names as Twarożna Góra in Poland, Tvarožná in the Czechia, and Tvarožná in Slovakia, or Tvarog – the castle ruins in Dobrova in Styria. Two toponomastic records in Novgorod land from the 15th century: Svaruzovo and Svaryz should be also added. Several names with the root svar- have survived in Slovenia, such as Svarje, Svarošek, the hydronym Svarina, or the toponym recorded as Zwarocz northwest of Celje. The place name Sromlje (Swaromel in 1309) originally referred to the inhabitants of the settlement of Svarom. The village of Verače was also called Tbaraschitzberg or Svarozhits Hill (Slovene: Svarozhichev hrib) in archival sources, but only since 1480. Torek near Senovo was called Twaroch in 1309.

Interpretations 
Svarozhits is interpreted as the god of fire. In Indo-European mythologies, there is a special fire deity who is endowed with male sex and even male potency, such as Agni or Atar. Agni is born ignited by Indra from the friction of two querns, Heaven and Earth, which refers to fire as the effect of sexual intercourse, and Svarozhits is the son of Svarog, who is often interpreted as the god of sky, and as a culture hero – a blacksmith who wields fire. A Kuyavian folk song is associated with this motif:

Some researchers also believe that Svarozhits is identical with Dazhbog. This is supported by the fact that the name Svarozhits literally means "son of Svarog," and in the Primary Chronicle, which contains an excerpt from the Slavic translation of the Chronicle of John Malalas, Dažbog is also depicted as the son of Svarog. Additionally, it is uncertain where the translation of the Chronicle was made; according to Henryk Łowmiański, the argument for the Bulgarian translation of the Chronicle is that in Bulgarian language the suffix -its, -ich has been completely forgotten, so that in Bulgarian language Dazhbog is called "the son of Svarog", and in other parts of Slavdom he is simply called Svarozhits. However, there is no general consensus on this interpretation, and the Sermon by the Holy Father Saint John Chrysostom, which mentions both Svarozhits and Dazhbog, is given as an argument against it. In that case, both gods would be brothers, the sons of Svarog, Svarozhits would be equivalent to Agni, and Dazhbog would be equivalent to Surya.

Perhaps Bruno mentioned St. Maurice, the patron saint of knighthood and armed struggle, in his letter because he considered him to be the christian equivalent of Svarozhits.

Svarozhits-Radegast 

Svarozhits is most likely identical with Radegast, the god mentioned by Adam of Bremen as the chief god of Radogost, where according to earlier sources Svarozhits was supposed to be the chief god, and, according to Helmold, the god of the Obodrites.

Notes

References

Bibliography 

Slavic gods
Fire gods
Solar gods
Smithing gods
War gods